Patti Miller (born 1954), an Australian writer, was born and grew up near Wellington, New South Wales, Australia. She holds a BA (Communications) and an MA (Writing) from the University of Technology, Sydney (UTS). She is the author of ten books and numerous articles and essays published in national newspapers and literary magazines. She has taught literature and writing at UTS, University of Western Sydney, Australian Writers’ Centre and other writers’ centres and is the founder and director of its Life Stories Workshop, which aims to develop and support memoir and creative non-fiction writing. Miller is a member of the Australian Society of Authors.

Works
 
 
 
 
 
 
 
 
 
 
"In gertrude's footsteps", Sydney Morning Herald, 13 November 2008
"Dirty dozen don't stay home", Sun Herald, Sydney, 28 December 2010
"Sex and drugs and Patrick White", Eureka St, 12 June 2012
"Erasure of an Aboriginal temple", Eureka St, 2 May 2012

Awards and recognition
Miller's seventh book, The Mind of a Thief, won the 2013 NSW Community and Regional History Prize in the NSW Premier's History Awards and was long-listed for the Stella Prize in 2013., long-listed for the Nita Kibble Award 2013 and shortlisted for the WA premier's Prize for Non-Fiction.

References

External links
 
 ABC Radio Life Matters
 Austlit
 Varuna, A Writers’ House
 Australian Writers’ Centre
 NSW Writers' Centre
 Sydney Morning Herald: Every Day I Write the Book by Susan Wyndham, March 10, 2001

1954 births
Australian writers
Australian women writers
Living people
University of Technology Sydney alumni